"Tired of Winning" is a song by American rock band Nothing More. It was their first single off of their sixth studio album Spirits. It peaked at number 5 on the Billboard Mainstream Rock Songs chart in 2022.

Background
"Tired of Winning" was released as the first official single from the band's fifth studio album, Spirits on April 28, 2022. A music video was released at the same time. The song was the second to be released ahead of Spirits October 2022 release date, following promo song "Turn It Up Like (Stand in the Fire)" a month prior. By July 2022, the song had hit the top 10 of the Billboard Mainstream Rock Songs chart, eventually peaking shortly after at number 5. An extended version of the single, contain another track from the album, "Ships in the Night", was released at the same time. The extended version was also featured on the soundtrack to the film The Retaliators, which was released in September 2022.

Themes and composition
Loudwire described the song as "thought-provoking" and a "heavy track with some equally intense lyrical content". Frontman Jonny Hawkins described the song as being about self-sabotage and humanity's inclination to never be happy or content with what they have, and it leading to them feeling miserable as a result. He elaborated: 

Hawkin's described the band's intent with creating the song's sound as if "aliens had a baby with a 90's rock band" and that the accompanying music video was "that baby grew up, dropped out of college and made [the] music video". The extended single version of the song contains a spoken word segment by philosopher Alan Watts, who had spoken word sound samples on numerous tracks off the band's 2017 album The Stories We Tell Ourselves.

Personnel
Band

 Jonny Hawkins – lead vocals
 Mark Vollelunga – guitar
 Daniel Oliver – bass, keyboards
 Ben Anderson – drums

Charts

References

 2022 singles
Nothing More songs